Acrocercops albofasciella is a moth of the family Gracillariidae. It is known from Japan (Kyūshū, Honshū).

The wingspan is about 7.5 mm.

The larvae feed on Ficus species. They probably mine the leaves of their host plant.

References 

albofasciella
Moths described in 1926
Moths of Japan